Thornton in Lonsdale is a village and civil parish in the Craven District and ceremonial county of North Yorkshire in England. Its main claims to fame are the Marton Arms pub and St Oswald's Church, Sir Arthur Conan Doyle married his first wife at this church in 1885 and held his reception at The Marton Arms before setting off to Ireland on honeymoon. Doyle's mother resided at nearby Masongill from 1882 to 1917.

History 

 In 1086 the Domesday Book listed on folio 301v under Craven Torntun & in Borch, Orm vi curactes ad geld. – that is in Thornton in Lonsdale with Burrow-with-Burrow Orm has circa 720 acres of plough-land to be taxed. This manor belonged to Orm, one of the family of Norse Noblemen who held the most land in Northern England. All estates would also include grazing land but since only arable land was tallied their total area can only be induced.

Historical parish
Because the parish of Thornton in Lonsdale was in the Lonsdale Hundred, a region more ancient than the county of Lancashire, it lay across two counties. A strip down the left side of the parish including Ireby was in Lancashire.
However the majority of the parish, including Thornton and Burton in Lonsdale, was in Yorkshire.

References

External links

 St Oswald's Church, Thornton in Lonsdale

Villages in North Yorkshire
Civil parishes in North Yorkshire